Abstract Point of View is a studio album by guitarist Faraz Anwar, released in December 2001 through Gnarly Geezer Records (an independent label founded in the late 1990s by guitarist Allan Holdsworth) and reissued on September 21, 2004 through Lion Music.

Track listing

Personnel
Faraz Anwar – guitar, keyboard, drum programming (except track 5), sequencing, bass (except track 5), arrangement, mixing, production
Fahad Khan – drums (track 5)
Mekaal Hasan – bass (track 5), engineering, mixing, mastering
Jamal Mustafa – engineering

References

External links
Faraz Anwar at Lion Music

2001 debut albums
Lion Music albums